The history of Western painting represents a continuous, though disrupted, tradition from antiquity until the present time. Until the mid-19th century it was primarily concerned with representational and Classical modes of production, after which time more modern, abstract and conceptual forms gained favor.

Initially serving imperial, private, civic, and religious patronage, Western painting later found audiences in the aristocracy and the middle class. From the Middle Ages through the Renaissance painters worked for the church and a wealthy aristocracy. Beginning with the Baroque era artists received private commissions from a more educated and prosperous middle class. The idea of "art for art's sake" began to find expression in the work of the Romantic painters like Francisco de Goya, John Constable, and J. M. W. Turner. During the 19th century commercial galleries became established and continued to provide patronage in the 20th century.

Western painting reached its zenith in Europe during the Renaissance, in conjunction with the refinement of drawing, use of perspective, ambitious architecture, tapestry, stained glass, sculpture, and the period before and after the advent of the printing press. Following the depth of discovery and the complexity of innovations of the Renaissance, the rich heritage of Western painting continued from the Baroque period to Contemporary art.

Pre-history

The history of painting reaches back in time to artifacts from pre-historic artists, and spans all cultures. The oldest known paintings are at the Grotte Chauvet in France, claimed by some historians to be about 32,000 years old. They are engraved and painted using red ochre and black pigment and show horses, rhinoceros, lions, buffalo, mammoth, or humans often hunting. There are examples of cave paintings all over the world—in France, India, Spain, Portugal, China, Australia etc. There are many common themes throughout the different places that the paintings have been found; implying the universality of purpose and similarity of the impulses that might have inspired the artists to create the imagery. Various conjectures have been made as to the meaning these paintings had to the artists who made them. Prehistoric men may have painted animals to "catch" their soul or spirit in order to hunt them more easily, or the paintings may represent an animistic vision and homage to surrounding nature, or they may be the result of a basic need of expression that is innate to human beings, or they may be recordings of the life experiences of the artists and related stories from the members of their circle.

Western painting

Greece and Rome

The first western civilization is also known as the Minoan civilization. Minoan painting is the art produced by the Bronze Age Aegean Minoan civilization from about 3000 to 1100 BC, though the most extensive and finest survivals come from approximately 2300 to 1400 BC.  It forms part of the wider grouping of Aegean art, and in later periods came for a time to have a dominant influence over Cycladic art.  Since wood and textiles have decomposed, the best-preserved (and most instructive) surviving examples of Minoan art are its pottery, palace architecture (with frescos which include "the earliest pure landscapes anywhere"), small sculptures in various materials, jewellery, metal vessels, and intricately-carved seals.

It was influenced by the neighbouring cultures of Ancient Egypt and the ancient Near East, which had produced sophisticated urban art for much longer, but the character of the small but wealthy mercantile Minoan cities was very different, with little evidence of large temple-based religion, monarchs, or warfare, and "all the imaginative power and childlike freshness of a very young culture".  All these aspects of the Minoan culture remain rather mysterious. Sinclair Hood described an "essential quality of the finest Minoan art, the ability to create an atmosphere of movement and life although following a set of highly formal conventions".

The largest and best collection of Minoan art is in the Heraklion Archaeological Museum ("AMH") near Knossos, on the northern coast of Crete. Minoan art and other remnants of material culture, especially the sequence of ceramic styles, have been used by archaeologists to define the three main phases of Minoan culture (EM, MM, LM), and their many sub-phases.  The dates to be attached to these remain much discussed, although within narrowing ranges.

The relationship of Minoan art to that of other contemporary cultures and later Ancient Greek art has been much discussed. It clearly dominated Mycenaean art and Cycladic art of the same periods, even after Crete was occupied by the Mycenaeans, but only some aspects of the tradition survived the Greek Dark Ages after the collapse of  Mycenaean Greece.

To the north of Egypt was the Minoan civilization on the island of Crete. The wall paintings found in the palace of Knossos are similar to those of the Egyptians but much more free in style.

Around 1100 BC, tribes from the north of Greece conquered Greece and its art took a new direction. The culture of ancient Greece is noteworthy for its outstanding contributions to the visual arts. Painting on pottery of ancient Greece and ceramics gives a particularly informative glimpse into the way society in ancient Greece functioned. Many fine examples of black-figure vase painting and red-figure vase painting still exist. Some famous Greek painters who worked on wood panels and are mentioned in texts are Apelles, Zeuxis and Parrhasius; however, with the single exception of the Pitsa panels, no examples of ancient Greek panel painting survive, only written descriptions by their contemporaries or later Romans.  Zeuxis lived in the 5th century BC and was said to be the first to use sfumato. According to Pliny the Elder, the realism of his paintings was such that birds tried to eat the painted grapes.  Apelles is described as the greatest painter of antiquity, and is noted for perfect technique in drawing, brilliant color, and modeling.

Roman art was influenced by Greece and can in part be taken as a descendant of ancient Greek painting. However, Roman painting does have important unique characteristics. Surviving Roman paintings include wall paintings and frescoes, many from villas in Campania, in Southern Italy at sites such as Pompeii and Herculaneum. Such painting can be grouped into 4 main "styles" or periods and may contain the first examples of trompe-l'œil, pseudo-perspective, and pure landscape. Almost the only painted portraits surviving from the ancient world are a large number of coffin-portraits of bust form found in the Late Antique cemetery of Al-Fayum. Although these were neither of the best period nor the highest quality, they are impressive in themselves, and give an idea of the quality that the finest ancient work must have had. A very small number of miniatures from Late Antique illustrated books also survive, and a rather larger number of copies of them from the Early Medieval period.

Middle Ages

The rise of Christianity imparted a different spirit and aim to painting styles. Byzantine art, once its style was established by the 6th century, placed great emphasis on retaining traditional iconography and style, and gradually evolved during the thousand years of the Byzantine Empire and the living traditions of Greek and Russian Orthodox icon-painting.  Byzantine painting has a hieratic feeling and icons were and still are seen as a representation of divine revelation.  There were many frescos, but fewer of these have survived than mosaics.
Byzantine art has been compared to contemporary abstraction, in its flatness and highly stylised depictions of figures and landscape.  Some periods of Byzantine art, especially the so-called Macedonian art of around the 10th century, are more flexible in approach. Frescoes of the Palaeologian Renaissance of the early 14th century survive in the Chora Church in Istanbul.

In post-Antique Catholic Europe the first distinctive artistic style to emerge that included painting was the Insular art of the British Isles, where the only surviving examples are miniatures in Illuminated manuscripts such as the Book of Kells. These are most famous for their abstract decoration, although figures, and sometimes scenes, were also depicted, especially in Evangelist portraits. Carolingian and Ottonian art also survives mostly in manuscripts, although some wall-painting remain, and more are documented.  The art of this period combines Insular and "barbarian" influences with a strong Byzantine influence and an aspiration to recover classical monumentality and poise.

Walls of Romanesque and Gothic churches were decorated with frescoes as well as sculpture and many of the few remaining murals have great intensity, and combine the decorative energy of Insular art with a new monumentality in the treatment of figures. Far more miniatures in Illuminated manuscripts survive from the period, showing the same characteristics, which continue into the Gothic period.

Panel painting becomes more common during the Romanesque period, under the heavy influence of Byzantine icons.  Towards the middle of the 13th century, Medieval art and Gothic painting became more realistic, with the beginnings of interest in the depiction of volume and perspective in Italy with Cimabue and then his pupil Giotto.  From Giotto on, the treatment of composition by the best painters also became much more free and innovative.  They are considered to be the two great medieval masters of painting in western culture. Cimabue, within the Byzantine tradition, used a more realistic and dramatic approach to his art. His pupil, Giotto, took these innovations to a higher level which in turn set the foundations for the western painting tradition. Both artists were pioneers in the move towards naturalism.

Churches were built with more and more windows and the use of colorful stained glass become a staple in decoration. One of the most famous examples of this is found in the cathedral of Notre Dame de Paris. By the 14th century Western societies were both richer and more cultivated and painters found new patrons in the nobility and even the bourgeoisie. Illuminated manuscripts took on a new character and slim, fashionably dressed court women were shown in their landscapes. This style soon became known as International Gothic style and was dominant from 1375 to 1425 with and tempera panel paintings and altarpieces gaining importance.

Renaissance and Mannerism

The Renaissance (French for 'rebirth'), a cultural movement roughly spanning the 14th through the mid-17th century, was driven by Renaissance humanism and the study of classical sources. In painting, in the 1420s and 1430s leading painters in Italy and the Low Countries separately developed new ways of painting which allowed the paintings to appear more realistic than in the works of established painters, whose style is referred to as International Gothic, or in some cases as Proto-Renaissance (mainly in Italy).  This period, lasting until about 1495, became known as the Early Renaissance.

In the Flanders area of the Low Countries, following developments made in the illumination of manuscripts, especially by the Limbourg Brothers, who died in 1416, artists became fascinated by the tangible in the visible world and began representing objects in an extremely naturalistic way. The adoption of oil painting whose first use on panel paintings was traditionally, but erroneously, credited to Jan van Eyck, made possible a new verisimilitude in depicting this naturalism. The medium of oil paint was already present in the work of Melchior Broederlam (who died in 1409), but Robert Campin (previously known as the Master of Flémalle) and van Eyck brought its use to new heights and employed it to represent the naturalism for which they were aiming. With this new medium, the painters of this period were capable of creating richer colors with a deep intense tonality. The illusion of glowing light with a porcelain-like finish characterized Early Netherlandish painting and was a major difference to the matte surface of tempera paint used in Italy. 

Unlike the Italians, whose work drew heavily from the art of ancient Rome, the northerners retained a stylistic residue of the sculpture and illuminated manuscripts of the Middle Ages (especially its naturalism).  Another important Netherlandish painter of this period was Rogier van der Weyden, a pupil of Campin, whose compositions stressed human emotion and drama, demonstrated for instance in his Descent from the Cross, which ranks among the most famous works of the 15th century and was the most influential Netherlandish painting of Christ's crucifixion. Other important artists were Hugo van der Goes (whose work was highly influential in Italy), Dieric Bouts (who was among the first northern painters to demonstrate the use of a single vanishing point), Petrus Christus, Hans Memling and Gerard David.  Collectively, the advances in painting in Europe north of the Alps is known as the Northern Renaissance.

In Italian Renaissance painting, the art of Classical antiquity inspired a style of painting that emphasized the ideal. Masaccio is credited with making advances in linear perspective, the depiction of volume in his figures, and in portraying emotions on the faces of his figures in the 1420s.  Then, artists such as Paolo Uccello, Fra Angelico, Piero della Francesca, Andrea Mantegna, Filippo Lippi, and Sandro Botticelli, in the Early Renaissance period lasting to about 1495, and then Leonardo da Vinci, Michelangelo Buonarroti, and Raphael during the High Renaissance from about 1495 to 1520, took painting to a higher level through the use of perspective, the study of human anatomy and proportion, and through their development of an unprecedented refinement in drawing and painting techniques. A somewhat more naturalistic High Renaissance style emerged in Venice. Painters of the Venetian school, such as Giovanni Bellini, Giorgione, Titian, and Veronese, were less concerned with precision in their drawing than with the richness of color and unity of effect that could be achieved by a more spontaneous approach to painting.

Flemish, Dutch and German painters of the Northern High Renaissance such as Albrecht Dürer, Lucas Cranach, Matthias Grünewald, and Hans Holbein the Younger had a different approach than their Italian counterparts, one that is more realistic and less idealized. Some northern painters, beginning with Dürer in the 1490s, traveled to Italy to see works of the Italian High Renaissance and they incorporated the features of the Italian art into their own to varying degrees. A generation later, the start of genre painting as a subject for large works began with Peter Aertsen and Pieter Bruegel. A later generation of Northern Renaissance painters who traveled to Rome and adopted much of the idealized approach of the Italian Renaissance became known as Romanists.

Renaissance painting reflects the revolution of ideas and science (astronomy, geography) that occurred in this period, the Reformation, and the invention of the printing press. Printmaking became increasingly important, and practiced by many painters. Dürer, considered one of the greatest of printmakers, states that painters are not mere artisans but thinkers as well. With the development of easel painting in the Renaissance, painting gained independence from architecture. Easel paintings—movable pictures which could be hung easily on walls—became a popular alternative to paintings fixed to furniture, walls or other structures. Following centuries dominated by religious imagery, secular subject matter slowly returned to Western painting. Artists included visions of the world around them, or the products of their own imaginations in their paintings. Those who could afford the expense could become patrons and commission portraits of themselves or their family.

The High Renaissance in Italy gave rise to a stylized art known as Mannerism after 1520, although some painters, such as Titian and Paolo Veronese, continued painting in a High Renaissance style late into the century. In place of the balanced compositions and rational approach to perspective that characterized art at the dawn of the 16th century, the Mannerists sought instability, artifice, and doubt. The calm Virgins of Raphael and serene expressions of Leonardo's subjects are replaced by the troubled expressions of Pontormo and the emotional intensity of El Greco. Restless and unstable compositions, often extreme or disjunctive effects of perspective, and stylized poses are characteristic of Italian Mannerists such as Tintoretto, Pontormo, and Bronzino, and appeared later in the work of Northern Mannerists such as Hendrick Goltzius, Bartholomeus Spranger, and Joachim Wtewael.

Baroque and Rococo

Baroque painting is associated with the Baroque cultural movement, a movement often identified with Absolutism and the Counter Reformation or Catholic Revival; the existence of important Baroque painting in non-absolutist and Protestant states also, however, underscores its popularity, as the style spread throughout Western Europe.

Baroque painting is characterized by great drama, rich, deep color, and intense light and dark shadows with the purpose of the art being to evoke emotion and passion instead of the calm rationality that had been prized during the Renaissance. The earliest Baroque painters included the Caracci brothers, Annibale and Agostino, in the last score of the 16th century, and Caravaggio in the last decade of the century. Caravaggio is recognized as one of the greatest Baroque painters and an heir of the humanist painting of the High Renaissance. His realistic approach to the human figure, painted directly from life and dramatically spotlit against a dark background, shocked his contemporaries and opened a new chapter in the history of painting.  Baroque was the dominant style of painting beginning around 1600 and continuing throughout the 17th century. Among the greatest painters of the Baroque are Rubens, Velázquez, Rembrandt, Frans Hals, Johannes Vermeer, Le Nain, Jusepe de Ribera, Poussin, Tour, and Claude Lorraine, who focused on landscape painting.  Poussin, Claude and La Tour, all French, adopted a "classical" Baroque style with less focus on emotion and greater attention to the outine of the figures in the painting than on colour.  Most of these painters traveled to Italy as part of their training and would then take the Baroque style back to their homelands, although in some cases they remained in Italy for large portions of their career (Claude and Poussin).  In Italy, the Baroque style is epitomized by religious and mythological paintings in the Grand Manner by artists such as the Carracci, Guido Reni, and Luca Giordano. Illusionistic church ceiling frescoes by Pietro da Cortona seemed to open to the sky.

A much quieter type of Baroque emerged in the Dutch Republic, where easel paintings of everyday subjects were popular with middle-class collectors, and many painters became specialists in genre, others in landscape or seascape or still life. Vermeer, Gerard ter Borch, and Pieter de Hooch brought great technical refinement to the painting of domestic scenes, as did Willem Claesz. Heda to still life. In contrast, Rembrandt excelled in painting every type of subject, and developed an individual painterly style in which the chiaroscuro and dark backgrounds derived from Caravaggio and the Utrecht Caravaggists lose their theatrical quality.  Dutch Baroque painting is often referred to as Dutch Golden Age Painting.

During the 18th century, Rococo painting followed as a lighter extension of Baroque, often frivolous and erotic and using light pastel colours. Rococo developed first in the decorative arts and interior design in France. Louis XV's succession brought a change in the court artists and general artistic fashion.  The 1730s represented the height of Rococo development in France exemplified by the works of Antoine Watteau and François Boucher.  Rococo still maintained the Baroque taste for complex forms and intricate patterns, but by this point, it had begun to integrate a variety of diverse characteristics, including a taste for Oriental designs and asymmetric compositions.

The Rococo style spread with French artists and engraved publications.  It was readily received in the Catholic parts of Germany, Bohemia, and Austria, where it was merged with the lively German Baroque traditions.  German Rococo was applied with enthusiasm to churches and palaces, particularly in the south, while Frederician Rococo developed in the Kingdom of Prussia.

The French masters Watteau, Boucher and Fragonard represent the style, as do Giovanni Battista Tiepolo and Jean-Baptiste-Siméon Chardin who was considered by some as the best French painter of the 18th century – the Anti-Rococo. Portraiture was an important component of painting in all countries, but especially in England, where the leaders were William Hogarth, in a blunt realist style, and Francis Hayman, Angelica Kauffman (who was Swiss), Thomas Gainsborough and Joshua Reynolds in more flattering styles influenced by Anthony van Dyck. In France during the Rococo era Jean-Baptiste Greuze (the favorite painter of Denis Diderot), excelled in portraits and history paintings, and Maurice Quentin de La Tour and Élisabeth Vigée-Lebrun were highly accomplished portrait painters. La Tour specialized in pastel painting, which became a popular medium during this period.

William Hogarth helped develop a theoretical foundation for Rococo beauty. Though not intentionally referencing the movement, he argued in his Analysis of Beauty (1753) that the undulating lines and S-curves prominent in Rococo were the basis for grace and beauty in art or nature (unlike the straight line or the circle in Classicism). The beginning of the end for Rococo came in the early 1760s as figures like Voltaire and Jacques-François Blondel began to voice their criticism of the superficiality and degeneracy of the art.  Blondel decried the "ridiculous jumble of shells, dragons, reeds, palm-trees and plants" in contemporary interiors.

By 1785, Rococo had passed out of fashion in France, replaced by the order and seriousness of Neoclassical artists such as Jacques-Louis David, whose imposing history paintings depicting both historical and contemporary events embodied the ideals of the French Revolution.

19th century: Neo-classicism, History painting, Romanticism, Impressionism, Post Impressionism, Symbolism

After Rococo there arose in the late 18th century, in architecture, and then in painting severe neo-classicism, best represented by such artists as David and his heir Ingres. Ingres' work already contains much of the sensuality, but none of the spontaneity, that was to characterize Romanticism.

By the mid-19th century, painters became liberated from the demands of their patronage to only depict scenes from religion, mythology, portraiture or history. Art became more purely a means of personal expression in the work of painters like Francisco de Goya, John Constable, and J. M. W. Turner. Romantic painters turned landscape painting into a major genre, considered until then as a minor genre or as a decorative background for figure compositions.
Some of the major painters of this period are Eugène Delacroix, Théodore Géricault, J. M. W. Turner, Caspar David Friedrich and John Constable. Francisco Goya's late work demonstrates the Romantic interest in the irrational, the work of Arnold Böcklin evokes mystery, the work of the Pre-Raphaelite Brotherhood in England combines assiduous devotion to nature with nostalgia for medieval culture, and the paintings of Aesthetic movement artist James Abbott McNeill Whistler evoke sophistication, decadence, and the philosophy of "art for art's sake". In the United States the Romantic tradition of landscape painting was known as the Hudson River School: exponents include Thomas Cole, Frederic Edwin Church, Albert Bierstadt, Thomas Moran, and John Frederick Kensett. Luminism was a movement in American landscape painting related to the Hudson River School.

A major force in the turn towards Realism at mid-century was Gustave Courbet, whose unidealized paintings of common people offended viewers accustomed to the conventional subject matter and licked finish of academic art, but inspired many younger artists. The leading Barbizon School painter Jean-François Millet also painted landscapes and scenes of peasant life. Loosely associated with the Barbizon School was Camille Corot, who painted in both a romantic and a realistic vein; his work prefigures Impressionism, as did the paintings of Johan Jongkind and Eugène Boudin (who was one of the first French landscape painters to paint outdoors). Boudin was an important influence on the young Claude Monet, whom in 1857 he introduced to plein air painting.

In the latter third of the century Impressionists such as Édouard Manet, Claude Monet, Pierre-Auguste Renoir, Camille Pissarro, Alfred Sisley, Berthe Morisot, Mary Cassatt, and Edgar Degas worked in a more direct approach than had previously been exhibited publicly. They eschewed allegory and narrative in favor of individualized responses to the modern world, sometimes painted with little or no preparatory study, relying on deftness of drawing and a highly chromatic palette. Monet, Pissarro, and Sisley used the landscape as their primary motif, the transience of light and weather playing a major role in their work. Following a practice that had become increasingly popular by mid-century, they often ventured into the countryside together to paint in the open air, but not for the traditional purpose of making sketches to be developed into carefully finished works in the studio. By painting in sunlight directly from nature, and making bold use of the vivid synthetic pigments that had become available since the beginning of the century, they developed a lighter and brighter manner of painting.

Manet, Degas, Renoir, Morisot, and Cassatt concentrated primarily on the human subject. Both Manet and Degas reinterpreted classical figurative canons within contemporary situations; in Manet's case the re-imaginings met with hostile public reception. Renoir, Morisot, and Cassatt turned to domestic life for inspiration, with Renoir focusing on the female nude. While Sisley most closely adhered to the original principals of the Impressionist perception of the landscape, Monet sought challenges in increasingly chromatic and changeable conditions, culminating in his series of monumental works of Water Lilies painted in Giverny.

Post-Impressionists such as Paul Cézanne and the slightly younger Vincent van Gogh, Paul Gauguin, and Georges-Pierre Seurat led art to the edge of modernism. For Gauguin Impressionism gave way to a personal symbolism. Seurat transformed Impressionism's broken color into a scientific optical study, structured on frieze-like compositions. The painting technique he developed, called Divisionism, attracted many followers such as Paul Signac, and for a few years in the late 1880s Pissarro adopted some of his methods. Van Gogh's turbulent method of paint application, coupled with a sonorous use of color, predicted Expressionism and Fauvism, and Cézanne, desiring to unite classical composition with a revolutionary abstraction of natural forms, would come to be seen as a precursor of 20th-century art.

The spell of Impressionism was felt throughout the world, including in the United States, where it became integral to the painting of American Impressionists such as Childe Hassam, John Henry Twachtman, and Theodore Robinson. It also exerted influence on painters who were not primarily Impressionistic in theory, like the portrait and landscape painter John Singer Sargent. At the same time in America at the turn of the 20th century there existed a native and nearly insular realism, as richly embodied in the figurative work of Thomas Eakins, the Ashcan School, and the landscapes and seascapes of Winslow Homer, all of whose paintings were deeply invested in the solidity of natural forms.  The visionary landscape, a motive largely dependent on the ambiguity of the nocturne, found its advocates in Albert Pinkham Ryder and Ralph Albert Blakelock.

In the late 19th century there also were several, rather dissimilar, groups of Symbolist painters whose works resonated with younger artists of the 20th century, especially with the Fauvists and the Surrealists. Among them were Gustave Moreau, Odilon Redon, Pierre Puvis de Chavannes, Henri Fantin-Latour, Arnold Böcklin, Ferdinand Hodler, Edvard Munch, Félicien Rops, Jan Toorop, and Gustav Klimt, and the Russian Symbolists such as Mikhail Vrubel.

Symbolist painters mined mythology and dream imagery for a visual language of the soul, seeking evocative paintings that brought to mind a static world of silence. The symbols used in Symbolism are not the familiar emblems of mainstream iconography but intensely personal, private, obscure and ambiguous references. More a philosophy than an actual style of art, the Symbolist painters influenced the contemporary Art Nouveau movement and Les Nabis. In their exploration of dreamlike subjects, symbolist painters are found across centuries and cultures, as they are still today; Bernard Delvaille has described René Magritte's surrealism as "Symbolism plus Freud".

20th century

The heritage of painters like Van Gogh, Cézanne, Gauguin, and Seurat was essential for the development of modern art. At the beginning of the 20th century Henri Matisse and several other young artists including the pre-cubist Georges Braque, André Derain, Raoul Dufy and Maurice de Vlaminck revolutionized the Paris art world with "wild", multi-colored, expressive landscapes and figure paintings that the critics called Fauvism. Henri Matisse's second version of The Dance signifies a key point in his career and in the development of modern painting. It reflects Matisse's incipient fascination with primitive art: the intense warm colors against the cool blue-green background and the rhythmical succession of dancing nudes convey the feelings of emotional liberation and hedonism. Pablo Picasso made his first cubist paintings based on Cézanne's idea that all depiction of nature can be reduced to three solids: cube, sphere and cone. With the painting Les Demoiselles d'Avignon (1907), Picasso created a new and radical picture depicting a brothel scene with five prostitutes, violently painted women, reminiscent of African tribal masks and his own Cubist inventions. Cubism was jointly developed from about 1908 through 1912 by Pablo Picasso and Georges Braque, whose Violin and Candlestick, Paris (1910) is shown here. The first clear manifestation of Cubism was practised by Braque, Picasso, Jean Metzinger, Albert Gleizes, Fernand Léger, Henri Le Fauconnier, and Robert Delaunay. Juan Gris, Marcel Duchamp, Alexander Archipenko, Joseph Csaky and others soon joined. Synthetic cubism, practiced by Braque and Picasso, is characterized by the introduction of different textures, surfaces, collage elements, papier collé and a large variety of merged subject matter.

The Salon d'Automne of 1905 brought notoriety and attention to the works of Henri Matisse and Fauvism. The group gained their name after critic Louis Vauxcelles described their work with the phrase "Donatello chez les fauves" ("Donatello among the wild beasts"), contrasting the paintings with a Renaissance-type sculpture that shared the room with them. The jungle scene The Hungry Lion Throws Itself on the Antelope by Henri Rousseau (who was not a Fauve) hung near the works by Matisse and may have inspired the sarcastic term used in the press. Vauxcelles' comment was printed on 17 October 1905 in the daily newspaper Gil Blas, and passed into popular usage.

In the first two decades of the 20th century and after cubism, several other important movements emerged; Futurism (Balla), Abstract art (Kandinsky) Der Blaue Reiter (Kandinsky and Franz Marc), Bauhaus (Kandinsky and Klee), Orphism, (Delaunay and Kupka), Synchromism (Russell), De Stijl (van Doesburg and Mondrian), Suprematism (Malevich), Constructivism (Tatlin), Dadaism (Duchamp, Picabia and Arp), and Surrealism (de Chirico, André Breton, Miró, Magritte, Dalí and Ernst).  Modern painting influenced all the visual arts, from Modernist architecture and design, to avant-garde film, theatre and modern dance and became an experimental laboratory for the expression of visual experience, from photography and concrete poetry to advertising art and fashion.

Fauvism, Der Blaue Reiter, Die Brücke

Fauvism was a loose grouping of early 20th-century artists whose works emphasized painterly qualities, and the imaginative use of deep color over the representational values. The leaders of the movement were Henri Matisse and André Derain – friendly rivals of a sort, each with his own followers.  Ultimately Matisse became the yang to Picasso's yin in the 20th century. Fauvist painters included Albert Marquet, Charles Camoin, Maurice de Vlaminck, Raoul Dufy, Othon Friesz, the Dutch painter Kees van Dongen, and Picasso's partner in Cubism, Georges Braque amongst others.

Fauvism had no concrete theories, and was short lived, beginning in 1905 and ending in 1907. They had only three exhibitions. Matisse was seen as the leader of the movement, due to his seniority in age and prior self-establishment in the academic art world. His 1905 portrait of Mme. Matisse, The Green Stripe, caused a sensation in Paris when it was first exhibited. He said he wanted to create art to delight, and it can be said that his use of bright colors tries to maintain serenity of composition. In 1906 at the suggestion of his dealer Ambroise Vollard, André Derain went to London and produced a series of paintings including Charing Cross Bridge, London in the Fauvist style, paraphrasing the famous series by the Impressionist painter Claude Monet.

By 1907 Fauvism no longer was a shocking new movement, and Appolinaire said of Matisse in an article published in La Falange, "We are not here in the presence of an extravagant or an extremist undertaking: Matisse's art is eminently reasonable."

Die Brücke was a group of German expressionist artists formed in Dresden in 1905. Founding members were Fritz Bleyl, Erich Heckel, Ernst Ludwig Kirchner and Karl Schmidt-Rottluff. Later members included Max Pechstein and Otto Mueller. This seminal group had a major impact on the evolution of modern art in the 20th century and created the style of Expressionism.

Der Blaue Reiter was a German movement lasting from 1911 to 1914, fundamental to Expressionism. Wassily Kandinsky, Franz Marc, August Macke, Alexej von Jawlensky, whose psychically expressive painting of the Russian dancer Portrait of Alexander Sakharoff (1909) is seen here, Marianne von Werefkin, Lyonel Feininger and others founded the Der Blaue Reiter group in response to the rejection of Kandinsky's painting Last Judgement from an exhibition. Der Blaue Reiter lacked a central artistic manifesto, but was centered around Kandinsky and Marc. Artists Gabriele Münter and Paul Klee were also involved. The name of the movement comes from a 1903 painting by Kandinsky. For Kandinsky, blue is the color of spirituality: the darker the blue, the more it awakens human desire for the eternal.

Expressionism, Symbolism, American Modernism, Bauhaus

Expressionism and Symbolism are broad rubrics that involve several related movements in 20th-century painting that dominated much of the avant-garde art being made in Western, Eastern and Northern Europe. Expressionist works were painted largely between World War I and World War II, mostly in France, Germany, Norway, Russia, Belgium, and Austria. Fauvism, Die Brücke, and Der Blaue Reiter are three of the best known groups of Expressionist and Symbolist painters. Marc Chagall's painting I and the Village tells an autobiographical story that examines the relationship between the artist and his origins, with a lexicon of artistic Symbolism. Gustav Klimt, Egon Schiele, Edvard Munch, Emil Nolde, Chaïm Soutine, James Ensor, Oskar Kokoschka, Ernst Ludwig Kirchner, Max Beckmann, Franz Marc, Georges Rouault, Amedeo Modigliani, and some Americans abroad such as Marsden Hartley and Stuart Davis, were considered influential expressionist painters. Although Alberto Giacometti is primarily thought of as a Surrealist sculptor, he made intense expressionist paintings as well.

American painters during the period between World War I and World War II tended to go to Europe for recognition. Modernist artists like Marsden Hartley, Patrick Henry Bruce, Gerald Murphy and Stuart Davis created reputations abroad. While Patrick Henry Bruce created cubist related paintings in Europe, both Stuart Davis and Gerald Murphy made paintings that were early inspirations for American pop art and Marsden Hartley experimented with expressionism. During the 1920s photographer Alfred Stieglitz exhibited Georgia O'Keeffe, Arthur Dove, Alfred Henry Maurer, Charles Demuth, John Marin and other artists including European Masters Henri Matisse, Auguste Rodin, Henri Rousseau, Paul Cézanne, and Picasso, at his New York City gallery the 291. In Europe masters like Henri Matisse and Pierre Bonnard continued developing their narrative styles independent of any movement.

Pioneers of abstraction

Wassily Kandinsky is generally considered one of the first important painters of modern abstract art. As an early modernist, he theorized as did contemporary occultists and theosophists, that pure visual abstraction had corollary vibrations with sound and music. They posited that pure abstraction could express pure spirituality. His earliest abstractions were generally titled as the example in the Composition VII, making connection to the work of the composers of music. Kandinsky included many of his theories about abstract art in his book Concerning the Spiritual in Art. Other major pioneers of early abstraction include Swedish painter Hilma af Klint, Russian painter Kazimir Malevich, and Swiss painter Paul Klee. Robert Delaunay was a French artist who is associated with Orphism, (reminiscent of a link between pure abstraction and cubism). His key contributions to abstract painting refer to his bold use of color and his experimentation of both depth and tone.

Dada and Surrealism

Marcel Duchamp came to international prominence in the wake of the New York City Armory Show in 1913 where his Nude Descending a Staircase, No. 2 became a cause célèbre. He subsequently created The Bride Stripped Bare by Her Bachelors, Even, Large Glass. The Large Glass pushed the art of painting to radical new limits being part painting, part collage, part construction. Duchamp (who was soon to renounce artmaking for chess) became closely associated with the Dada movement that began in neutral Zürich, Switzerland, during World War I and peaked from 1916 to 1920. The movement primarily involved visual arts, literature (poetry, art manifestoes, art theory), theatre, and graphic design to advance its antiwar politic and rejection of the prevailing standards in art through anti-art cultural works. Other artists associated with the Dada movement include Francis Picabia, Man Ray, Kurt Schwitters, Hannah Höch, Tristan Tzara, Hans Richter, Jean Arp, and Sophie Taeuber-Arp. Duchamp and several Dadaists are also associated with Surrealism, the movement that dominated European painting in the 1920s and 1930s.

In 1924 André Breton published the Surrealist Manifesto. The Surrealist movement in painting became synonymous with the avant-garde and featured artists whose works varied from the abstract to the super-realist. With works on paper like Machine Turn Quickly, Francis Picabia continued his involvement in the Dada movement through 1919 in Zürich and Paris, before breaking away from it after developing an interest in Surrealist art. Yves Tanguy, René Magritte and Salvador Dalí are particularly known for their realistic depictions of dream imagery and fantastic manifestations of the imagination. During the 1920s André Masson's work was decisive in helping the young artist Joan Miró find his roots in Surrealist painting. Miró's The Tilled Field (1923–1924) verges on abstraction while suggesting a complex of objects and figures and arrangements of sexually active characters; it was Miró's first Surrealist masterpiece. Joan Miró, Jean Arp, André Masson, and Max Ernst were very influential, especially in the United States during the 1940s.

Max Ernst, whose 1920 painting Murdering Airplane is seen here, studied philosophy and psychology in Bonn and was interested in the alternative realities experienced by the insane. His paintings may have been inspired by the psychoanalyst Sigmund Freud's study of the delusions of a paranoiac, Daniel Paul Schreber. Freud identified Schreber's fantasy of becoming a woman as a castration complex. The central image of two pairs of legs refers to Schreber's hermaphroditic desires. Ernst's inscription on the back of the painting reads: The picture is curious because of its symmetry. The two sexes balance one another.

Throughout the 1930s, Surrealism continued to become more visible to the public at large. A Surrealist group developed in Britain and, according to Breton, their 1936 London International Surrealist Exhibition was a high-water mark of the period and became the model for international exhibitions. Surrealist groups in Japan, and especially in Latin America, the Caribbean and in Mexico produced innovative and original works. Other prominent surrealist artists include Giorgio de Chirico, Méret Oppenheim, Toyen, Grégoire Michonze, Roberto Matta, Kay Sage, Leonora Carrington, Dorothea Tanning, and Leonor Fini.

Neue Sachlichkeit, Social realism, regionalism, American Scene painting, Symbolism

During the 1920s and the 1930s and the Great Depression, the European art scene was characterized by Surrealism, late Cubism, the Bauhaus, De Stijl, Dada, Neue Sachlichkeit, and Expressionism; and was occupied by masterful modernist color painters like Henri Matisse and Pierre Bonnard.

In Germany Neue Sachlichkeit ("New Objectivity") emerged as Max Beckmann, Otto Dix, George Grosz and others politicized their paintings. The work of these artists grew out of expressionism, and was a response to the political tensions of the Weimar Republic, and was often sharply satirical.

During the 1930s radical leftist politics characterized many of the artists connected to Surrealism, including Pablo Picasso. On 26 April 1937, during the Spanish Civil War, the Basque town of Gernika was the scene of the "Bombing of Gernika" by the Condor Legion of Nazi Germany's Luftwaffe. The Germans were attacking to support the efforts of Francisco Franco to overthrow the Basque Government and the Spanish Republican government. Pablo Picasso painted his mural sized Guernica to commemorate the horrors of the bombing.

Guernica is an immense black-and-white, 3.5-metre (11 ft) tall and 7.8-metre (23 ft) wide mural painted in oil. The mural presents a scene of death, violence, brutality, suffering, and helplessness without portraying their immediate causes. The choice to paint in black and white invokes the immediacy of a newspaper photograph.
The painting was first exhibited in Paris in 1937, then Scandinavia and London, and in 1939 at Picasso's request the painting was sent to the United States in an extended loan (for safekeeping) at MoMA. Finally in accord with Picasso's wish to give the painting to the people of Spain as a gift, it was sent to Spain in 1981.

From the Great Depression of the 1930s through the years of World War II, American art was characterized by Social Realism and American Scene Painting. Regionalism movements that contained both political and social commentary dominated the art world in the USA. Artists such as Ben Shahn, Thomas Hart Benton, Grant Wood, George Tooker, John Steuart Curry, Reginald Marsh, and others became prominent.

American Gothic is a painting by Grant Wood from 1930. Portraying a pitchfork-holding farmer and a younger woman in front of a house of Carpenter Gothic style, it is one of the most familiar images in 20th-century American art. Art critics assumed it was satirical in intent; it was thought to be part of the trend towards increasingly critical depictions of rural America exemplified by Sherwood Anderson's 1919 Winesburg, Ohio, Sinclair Lewis' 1920 Main Street, and Carl Van Vechten's The Tattooed Countess in literature. However, with the onset of the Great Depression, the painting came to be seen as a depiction of steadfast American pioneer spirit.

A renaissance of the arts in Latin America included the Uruguayan painter Joaquín Torres García, the Mexican painter Rufino Tamayo, artists of the Mexican muralist movement such as Diego Rivera, David Siqueiros, José Orozco, Pedro Nel Gómez and Santiago Martinez Delgado, and the Symbolist painter Frida Kahlo. The muralists conveyed historic and political messages. Diego Rivera is perhaps best known by the public world for his 1933 mural, Man at the Crossroads, in the lobby of the RCA Building at Rockefeller Center. When his patron Nelson Rockefeller discovered that the mural included a portrait of Lenin and other communist imagery, he fired Rivera, and the unfinished work was eventually destroyed by Rockefeller's staff.

Frida Kahlo's works relate to Surrealism and to the Magic Realism movement in literature. Her works are often characterized by their stark portrayals of pain. Of her 143 paintings 55 are self-portraits, which frequently incorporate symbolic portrayals of her physical and psychological wounds.

Abstract expressionism

The 1940s in New York City heralded the triumph of American abstract expressionism, a movement that combined lessons learned from European Modernists via great teachers in America like Hans Hofmann and John D. Graham. American artists benefited from the presence of Piet Mondrian, Fernand Léger, Max Ernst and the André Breton group, Pierre Matisse's gallery, and Peggy Guggenheim's gallery The Art of This Century, as well as other factors.
 
Post-Second World War American painting called Abstract expressionism included artists like Jackson Pollock, Willem de Kooning, Arshile Gorky, Mark Rothko, Hans Hofmann, Clyfford Still, Franz Kline, Adolph Gottlieb, Barnett Newman, Mark Tobey, James Brooks, Philip Guston, Robert Motherwell, Conrad Marca-Relli, Jack Tworkov, Esteban Vicente, William Baziotes, Richard Pousette-Dart, Ad Reinhardt, Hedda Sterne, Jimmy Ernst, Bradley Walker Tomlin, and Theodoros Stamos, among others. American Abstract expressionism got its name in 1946 from the art critic Robert Coates.
Abstract expressionism, Action painting, and Color Field painting are synonymous with the New York School.

Technically Surrealism was an important predecessor for Abstract expressionism with its emphasis on spontaneous, automatic or subconscious creation. Jackson Pollock's dripping paint onto a canvas laid on the floor is a technique that has its roots in the work of André Masson. Another important early manifestation of what came to be abstract expressionism is the work of American Northwest artist Mark Tobey, especially his "white writing" canvases, which, though generally not large in scale, anticipate the "all over" look of Pollock's drip paintings.

Additionally, Abstract expressionism has an image of being rebellious, anarchic, highly idiosyncratic and, some feel, rather nihilistic. In practice, the term is applied to any number of artists working (mostly) in New York who had quite different styles, and even applied to work which is not especially abstract nor expressionist. Pollock's energetic "action paintings", with their "busy" feel, are different both technically and aesthetically, to the violent and grotesque Women series of Willem de Kooning. Woman V is one of a series of six paintings made by de Kooning between 1950 and 1953 that depict a three-quarter-length female figure. He began the first of these paintings, Woman I, in June 1950, repeatedly changing and painting out the image until January or February 1952, when the painting was abandoned unfinished. The art historian Meyer Schapiro saw the painting in de Kooning's studio and encouraged the artist to persist. De Kooning's response was to begin three other paintings on the same theme; Woman II, Woman III, and Woman IV. During the summer of 1952, spent at East Hampton, de Kooning further explored the theme through drawings and pastels. He finished work on Woman I by November 1952, and probably the other three women pictures were concluded at much the same time. The Woman series are decidedly figurative paintings. Another important artist is Franz Kline, as demonstrated by his painting High Street (1950), who was labelled an action painter because of his seemingly spontaneous and intense style, focusing less, or not at all, on figures or imagery, but on the actual brush strokes and use of canvas.

Clyfford Still, Barnett Newman, Adolph Gottlieb, and the serenely shimmering blocks of color in Mark Rothko's work (which is not what would usually be called expressionist and which Rothko denied was abstract), are classified as abstract expressionists, albeit from what Clement Greenberg termed the Color field direction of abstract expressionism. Both Hans Hofmann and Robert Motherwell can be described as practitioners of action painting and Color field painting.

During the 1950s Color Field painting initially referred to a particular type of abstract expressionism, especially the work of Mark Rothko, Clyfford Still, Barnett Newman, Robert Motherwell and Adolph Gottlieb. It essentially involved abstract paintings with large, flat expanses of color that expressed the sensual, and visual feelings and properties of large areas of nuanced surface. Art critic Clement Greenberg perceived Color Field painting as related to but different from Action painting. The overall expanse and gestalt of the work of the early color field painters speaks of an almost religious experience, awestruck in the face of an expanding universe of sensuality, color and surface. During the early-to-mid-1960s Color Field painting came to refer to the styles of artists like Jules Olitski, Kenneth Noland, and Helen Frankenthaler, whose works were related to second-generation abstract expressionism, and to younger artists like Larry Zox, and Frank Stella – all moving in a new direction.

Realism, Landscape, Seascape, Figuration, Still-Life, Cityscape

During the 1930s through the 1960s as abstract painting in America and Europe evolved into movements such as abstract expressionism, Color Field painting, Post-painterly Abstraction, Op art, hard-edge painting, Minimal art, shaped canvas painting, and Lyrical Abstraction. Other artists reacted as a response to the tendency toward abstraction allowing imagery to continue through various new contexts like the Bay Area Figurative Movement in the 1950s and new forms of expressionism from the 1940s through the 1960s. Throughout the 20th century many painters practiced Realism and used expressive imagery in landscape and figurative painting with contemporary subjects. They include artists as varied as Milton Avery, John D. Graham, Fairfield Porter, Edward Hopper, Andrew Wyeth, Balthus, Francis Bacon, Frank Auerbach, Lucian Freud, Leon Kossoff, Philip Pearlstein, Willem de Kooning, Arshile Gorky, Grace Hartigan, Robert De Niro, Sr., and Elaine de Kooning.

In Italy during this time, Giorgio Morandi was the foremost still-life painter, exploring a wide variety of approaches to depicting everyday bottles and kitchen implements.

 
Arshile Gorky's portrait of Willem de Kooning is an example of the evolution of abstract expressionism from the context of figure painting, cubism and surrealism. Along with his friends de Kooning and John D. Graham Gorky created bio-morphically shaped and abstracted figurative compositions that by the 1940s evolved into totally abstract paintings. Gorky's work seems to be a careful analysis of memory, emotion and shape, using line and color to express feeling and nature.

Study after Velázquez's Portrait of Pope Innocent X, 1953 is a painting by the Irish-born artist Francis Bacon and is an example of Post World War II European Expressionism. The work shows a distorted version of the Portrait of Innocent X painted by the Spanish artist Diego Velázquez in 1650. The work is one of a series of variants of the Velázquez painting which Bacon executed throughout the 1950s and early 1960s, over a total of forty-five works. When asked why he was compelled to revisit the subject so often, Bacon replied that he had nothing against the Popes, that he merely "wanted an excuse to use these colours, and you can't give ordinary clothes that purple colour without getting into a sort of false fauve manner." The Pope in this version seethes with anger and aggression, and the dark colors give the image a grotesque and nightmarish appearance. The pleated curtains of the backdrop are rendered transparent, and seem to fall through the Pope's face.

The figurative work of Francis Bacon, Frida Kahlo, Edward Hopper, Lucian Freud, Andrew Wyeth and others served as a kind of alternative to abstract expressionism. Nighthawks (1942) is a realist painting by Edward Hopper that portrays people sitting in a downtown diner late at night. It is not only Hopper's most famous painting, but one of the most recognizable in American art. The urban street is empty outside the diner, and inside none of the three patrons is apparently looking or talking to the others but instead is lost in their own thoughts. This portrayal of modern urban life as empty or lonely is a common theme throughout Hopper's work. One of the most well-known images in 20th-century American art is Wyeth's tempera painting, Christina's World, in the collection of the Museum of Modern Art in New York City. It depicts a woman lying on the ground in a treeless, mostly tawny field, looking up at and crawling towards a gray house on the horizon; a barn and various other small outbuildings are adjacent to the house.

After World War II the term School of Paris often referred to Tachisme, the European equivalent of American Abstract expressionism and those artists are also related to Cobra. Important proponents being Jean Dubuffet, Pierre Soulages, Nicolas de Staël, Hans Hartung, Serge Poliakoff, and Georges Mathieu, among several others. During the early 1950s Dubuffet (who was always a figurative artist) and de Staël abandoned abstraction, and returned to imagery via figuration and landscape. De Staël's return to representation (seascapes, footballers, jazz musicians, seagulls) during the early 1950s can be seen as an influential precedent for the American Bay Area Figurative Movement, as many of those abstract painters like Richard Diebenkorn, David Park, Elmer Bischoff, Wayne Thiebaud, Nathan Oliveira, Joan Brown and others made a similar move; returning to imagery during the mid-1950s. Much of de Staël's late work – in particular his abstract landscapes of the mid-1950s – predicts Color Field painting and Lyrical Abstraction of the 1960s and 1970s. Milton Avery as well through his use of color and his interest in seascape and landscape paintings connected with the Color field aspect of Abstract expressionism as manifested by Adolph Gottlieb and Mark Rothko as well as the lessons American painters took from the work of Henri Matisse.

Pop art

Pop art in America was to a large degree initially inspired by the works of Jasper Johns, Larry Rivers, and Robert Rauschenberg, although the paintings of Gerald Murphy, Stuart Davis and Charles Demuth during the 1920s and 1930s foreshadow the style and subject matter of Pop art.

In New York City during the mid-1950s, Rauschenberg and Johns created works of art that at first seemed to be continuations of Abstract expressionist painting. Actually their works, and the work of Larry Rivers, were radical departures from abstract expressionism especially in the use of banal and literal imagery and the inclusion of mundane materials into their work. Johns' use of various images and objects like chairs, numbers, targets, beer cans and the American Flag; Rivers' paintings of subjects drawn from popular culture such as George Washington crossing the Delaware, and his inclusions of images from advertisements like the camel from Camel cigarettes; and Rauschenberg's surprising constructions using inclusions of objects and pictures taken from popular culture, hardware stores, junkyards, the city streets, and taxidermy, gave rise to a radical new movement in American art. Eventually by 1963 the movement came to be known worldwide as Pop art.

Pop art is exemplified by the artists Andy Warhol, Claes Oldenburg, Wayne Thiebaud, James Rosenquist, Jim Dine, Tom Wesselmann and Roy Lichtenstein among others. Lichtenstein used oil and Magna paint in works such as Drowning Girl (1963; Museum of Modern Art, New York), which was appropriated from the lead story in DC Comics' Secret Hearts #83.) Thick outlines, bold colors and Ben-Day dots reproduce the appearance of commercial printing. Lichtenstein would say of his own work: Abstract Expressionists "put things down on the canvas and responded to what they had done, to the color positions and sizes. My style looks completely different, but the nature of putting down lines pretty much is the same; mine just don't come out looking calligraphic, like Pollock's or Kline's." Pop art merges popular and mass culture with fine art, while injecting humor, irony, and recognizable imagery and content into the mix. In October 1962 the Sidney Janis Gallery mounted The New Realists, the first major Pop art group exhibition in an uptown art gallery in New York City. The show sent shockwaves through the New York School and reverberated worldwide. Campbell's Soup Cans (sometimes referred to as 32 Campbell's Soup Cans) is the title of an Andy Warhol work of art that was produced in 1962. It consists of thirty-two canvases of equal size, each consisting of a painting of a Campbell's Soup can—one of each canned soup variety the company offered at the time. The individual paintings were produced with a semi-mechanised silkscreen process, using a non-painterly style. They helped usher in Pop art as a major art movement that relied on themes from popular culture.

Earlier in England in 1956 the term Pop Art was used by Lawrence Alloway for paintings that celebrated consumerism of the post World War II era. This movement rejected Abstract expressionism and its focus on the hermeneutic and psychological interior, in favor of art which depicted material consumer culture, advertising, and iconography of the mass production age. The early works of English artist David Hockney, such as A Bigger Splash, and the works of Richard Hamilton, Peter Blake, and Eduardo Paolozzi, are considered seminal examples in the movement.
In New York's East Village 10th Street galleries artists were formulating an American version of Pop art. Claes Oldenburg had his storefront, and the Green Gallery on 57th Street began to show Tom Wesselmann and James Rosenquist. There is a connection between the radical works of Duchamp, and Man Ray, the rebellious Dadaists – with a sense of humor; and Pop Artists like Alex Katz, Claes Oldenburg, Andy Warhol, Roy Lichtenstein and the others.

Art Brut, New Realism, Bay Area Figurative Movement, Neo-Dada, Photorealism

During the 1950s and 1960s as abstract painting in America and Europe evolved into movements such as Color Field painting, Post painterly abstraction, Op art, hard-edge painting, Minimal art, shaped canvas painting, Lyrical Abstraction, and the continuation of Abstract expressionism. Other artists reacted as a response to the tendency toward abstraction with Art brut, as seen in Court les rues, 1962, by Jean Dubuffet, Fluxus, Neo-Dada, New Realism, Photorealism, allowing imagery to re-emerge through various new contexts like Pop art, the Bay Area Figurative Movement (a prime example is Diebenkorn's Cityscape I,(Landscape No. 1) (1963), and later in the 1970s Neo-expressionism. The Bay Area Figurative Movement of whom David Park, Elmer Bischoff, Nathan Oliveira and Richard Diebenkorn whose painting Cityscape 1 (1963) is a typical example, were influential members flourished during the 1950s and 1960s in California. Younger painters practiced the use of imagery in new and radical ways. Yves Klein, Arman, Martial Raysse, Christo, Niki de Saint Phalle, David Hockney, Alex Katz, Malcolm Morley, Ralph Goings, Audrey Flack, Richard Estes, Chuck Close, Susan Rothenberg, Eric Fischl, and Vija Celmins were a few who became prominent between the 1960s and the 1980s. Fairfield Porter was largely self-taught, and produced representational work in the midst of the Abstract Expressionist movement. His subjects were primarily landscapes, domestic interiors and portraits of family, friends and fellow artists.

Also during the 1960s and 1970s, there was a reaction against painting. Critics like Douglas Crimp viewed the work of artists like Ad Reinhardt, and declared the "death of painting". Artists began to practice new ways of making art. New movements gained prominence some of which are: Fluxus, Happening, Video art, Installation art Mail art, the situationists, Conceptual art, Postminimalism, Earth art, arte povera, performance art and body art among others.

Neo-Dada is also a movement that started in the 1950s and 1960s and was related to Abstract expressionism only with imagery. This trend, in which manufactured items are combined with artist materials, is exemplified by the work of Jasper Johns and Robert Rauschenberg. Rauschenberg's "combines" in the 1950s were forerunners of Pop Art and Installation art, and made use of the assemblage of large physical objects, including stuffed animals, birds and commercial photography. Rauschenberg, Johns, Larry Rivers, John Chamberlain, Claes Oldenburg, George Segal, Jim Dine, and Edward Kienholz among others created new conventions of art-making; they made acceptable in serious contemporary art circles the radical inclusion of unlikely materials as parts of their works of art.

Geometric abstraction, Op Art, Hard-Edge, Color field, Minimal Art, New Realism

During the 1960s and 1970s abstract painting continued to develop in America through varied styles. Geometric abstraction, Op art, hard-edge painting, Color Field painting and minimal painting, were some interrelated directions for advanced abstract painting as well as some other new movements. Morris Louis was an important pioneer in advanced Colorfield painting, his work can serve as a bridge between Abstract expressionism, Colorfield painting, and Minimal Art.  Two influential teachers, Josef Albers and Hans Hofmann, introduced a new generation of American artists to their advanced theories of color and space. Albers is best remembered for his work as a Geometric abstractionist painter and theorist. Most famous of all are the hundreds of paintings and prints that make up the series Homage to the Square. In this rigorous series, begun in 1949, Albers explored chromatic interactions with flat colored squares arranged concentrically on the canvas.  Albers' theories on art and education were formative for the next generation of artists.  His own paintings form the foundation of both hard-edge painting and Op art.

Josef Albers, Hans Hofmann, Ilya Bolotowsky, Burgoyne Diller, Victor Vasarely, Bridget Riley, Richard Anuszkiewicz, Frank Stella, Morris Louis, Kenneth Noland, Ellsworth Kelly, John McLaughlin, Barnett Newman, Larry Poons, Ronald Davis, John Hoyland, Larry Zox, Al Held, Mino Argento are artists closely associated with Geometric abstraction, Op art, Color Field painting, and in the case of Hofmann and Newman Abstract expressionism as well. Agnes Martin, Robert Mangold, Brice Marden, Jo Baer, Robert Ryman, Richard Tuttle, Neil Williams, David Novros, Paul Mogenson, are examples of artists associated with Minimalism and (exceptions of Martin, Baer and Marden) the use of the shaped canvas also during the period beginning in the early 1960s. Many Geometric abstract artists, minimalists, and Hard-edge painters elected to use the edges of the image to define the shape of the painting rather than accepting the rectangular format. In fact, the use of the shaped canvas is primarily associated with paintings of the 1960s and 1970s that are coolly abstract, formalistic, geometrical, objective, rationalistic, clean-lined, brashly sharp-edged, or minimalist in character. The Bykert Gallery, and the Park Place Gallery were important showcases for Minimalism and shaped canvas painting in New York City during the 1960s.

Shaped canvas, Washington Color School, Abstract Illusionism, Lyrical Abstraction

Color Field painting pointed toward a new direction in American painting, away from abstract expressionism. Related to Post-painterly abstraction, Suprematism, Abstract Expressionism, Hard-edge painting and Lyrical Abstraction, Color Field painting sought to rid art of superfluous rhetoric. Artists like Clyfford Still, Mark Rothko, Hans Hofmann, Morris Louis, Jules Olitski, Kenneth Noland, Helen Frankenthaler, Larry Zox, and others painted with a highly articulated and psychological use of color. In general these artists eliminated recognizable imagery. Certain artists made references to past or present art, but in general color field painting presents abstraction as an end in itself. In pursuing this direction of modern art, artists wanted to present each painting as one cohesive, monolithic image. Gene Davis along with Kenneth Noland, Morris Louis and several others was a member of the Washington Color School painters who began to create Color Field paintings in Washington, D.C. during the 1950s and 1960s, Black, Grey, Beat is a large vertical stripe painting and typical of Gene Davis's work.
Frank Stella, Kenneth Noland, Ellsworth Kelly, Barnett Newman, Ronald Davis, Neil Williams, Robert Mangold, Charles Hinman, Richard Tuttle, David Novros, and Al Loving are examples of artists associated with the use of the shaped canvas during the period beginning in the early 1960s.

From 1960 Frank Stella produced paintings in aluminum and copper paint and his first works using shaped canvases (canvases in a shape other than the traditional rectangle or square), often being in L, N, U or T-shapes. These later developed into more elaborate designs, in the Irregular Polygon series (1967), for example. Later he began his Protractor Series (1971) of paintings, in which arcs, sometimes overlapping, within square borders are arranged side by side to produce full and half circles painted in rings of concentric color. Harran II, 1967, is an example of the Protractor Series.

The Andre Emmerich Gallery, the Leo Castelli Gallery, the Richard Feigen Gallery, and the Park Place Gallery were important showcases for Color Field painting, shaped canvas painting and Lyrical Abstraction in New York City during the 1960s. There is a connection with post-painterly abstraction, which reacted against abstract expressionisms' mysticism, hyper-subjectivity, and emphasis on making the act of painting itself dramatically visible – as well as the solemn acceptance of the flat rectangle as an almost ritual prerequisite for serious painting. During the 1960s Color Field painting and Minimal art were often closely associated with each other. In actuality by the early 1970s both movements became decidedly diverse.

Lyrical Abstraction (the term being coined by Larry Aldrich, the founder of the Aldrich Contemporary Art Museum, Ridgefield Connecticut), encompassed what Aldrich said he saw in the studios of many artists at that time. It is also the name of an exhibition that originated in the Aldrich Museum and traveled to the Whitney Museum of American Art and other museums throughout the United States between 1969 and 1971. Lyrical Abstraction is a type of freewheeling abstract painting that emerged in the mid-1960s when abstract painters returned to various forms of painterly, pictorial, expressionism with a predominate focus on process, gestalt and repetitive compositional strategies in general. In contrast to Action Painting, where emphasis is on brushstrokes and high compositional drama, in Lyrical Abstraction—as exemplified by the 1971 Ronnie Landfield painting Garden of Delight—there is a sense of compositional randomness, relaxed compositional drama and an emphasis on process, repetition, and an all over sensibility. Lyrical Abstraction in the late 1960s is characterized by the paintings of Dan Christensen, Ronnie Landfield, Peter Young and others, and along with the Fluxus movement and Postminimalism (a term first coined by Robert Pincus-Witten in the pages of Artforum in 1969) sought to expand the boundaries of abstract painting and Minimalism by focusing on process, new materials and new ways of expression. Postminimalism often incorporating industrial materials, raw materials, fabrications, found objects, installation, serial repetition, and often with references to Dada and Surrealism is best exemplified in the sculptures of Eva Hesse. Lyrical Abstraction, Conceptual Art, Postminimalism, Earth Art, Video, Performance art, Installation art, along with the continuation of Fluxus, Abstract Expressionism, Color Field painting, Hard-edge painting, Minimal Art, Op art, Pop art, Photorealism and New Realism extended the boundaries of Contemporary Art in the mid-1960s through the 1970s.

Abstract Illusionism, Monochrome, Minimalism, Postminimalism

One of the first artists specifically associated with Minimalism was Frank Stella, whose early "stripe" paintings were highlighted in the 1959 show, "16 Americans", organized by Dorothy Miller at the Museum of Modern Art in New York. The widths of the stripes in Stella's stripe paintings were not entirely subjective, but were determined by the dimensions of the lumber used to construct the supportive chassis upon which the canvas was stretched. In the show catalog, Carl Andre noted, "Art excludes the unnecessary. Frank Stella has found it necessary to paint stripes. There is nothing else in his painting." These reductive works were in sharp contrast to the energy-filled and apparently emotionally charged paintings of Willem de Kooning or Franz Kline and leaned more toward less gestural coloristic field paintings of Barnett Newman and Mark Rothko.

Artists such as Larry Poons—whose work related to Op Art with his emphasis on dots, ovals and after-images bouncing across color fields—Kenneth Noland, Ralph Humphrey, Robert Motherwell and Robert Ryman had also begun to explore stripes, monochromatic and Hard-edge formats from the late 1950s through the 1960s.

Because of a tendency in Minimalism to exclude the pictorial, illusionistic and fictive in favor of the literal—as demonstrated by Robert Mangold, who understood the concept of the shape of the canvas and its relationship to objecthood—there was a movement away from painterly and toward sculptural concerns. Donald Judd had started as a painter, and ended as a creator of objects. His seminal essay, "Specific Objects" (published in Arts Yearbook 8, 1965), was a touchstone of theory for the formation of Minimalist aesthetics. In this essay, Judd found a starting point for a new territory for American art, and a simultaneous rejection of residual inherited European artistic values.  He pointed to evidence of this development in the works of an array of artists active in New York at the time, including Jasper Johns, Dan Flavin and Lee Bontecou. Of "preliminary" importance for Judd was the work of George Earl Ortman , who had concretized and distilled painting's forms into blunt, tough, philosophically charged geometries. These Specific Objects inhabited a space not then comfortably classifiable as either painting or sculpture. That the categorical identity of such objects was itself in question, and that they avoided easy association with well-worn and over-familiar conventions, was a part of their value for Judd.

In a much more general sense, one might find European roots of Minimalism in the geometric abstractions painters in the Bauhaus, in the works of Piet Mondrian and other artists associated with the movement DeStijl, in Russian Constructivists and in the work of the Romanian sculptor Constantin Brâncuși. American painters such as Brice Marden and Cy Twombly show a clear European influence in their pure abstraction, minimalist painting of the 1960s. Ronald Davis polyurethane works from the late 1960s pay homage to the Broken Glass of Marcel Duchamp.
This movement was heavily criticised by high modernist formalist art critics and historians. Some anxious critics thought Minimalist art represented a misunderstanding of the modern dialectic of painting and sculpture as defined by critic Clement Greenberg, arguably the dominant American critic of painting in the period leading up to the 1960s. The most notable critique of Minimalism was produced by Michael Fried, a Greenbergian critic, who objected to the work on the basis of its "theatricality". In Art and Objecthood (published in Artforum in June 1967) he declared that the Minimalist work of art, particularly Minimalist sculpture, was based on an engagement with the physicality of the spectator. He argued that work like Robert Morris's transformed the act of viewing into a type of spectacle, in which the artifice of the act observation and the viewer's participation in the work were unveiled. Fried saw this displacement of the viewer's experience from an aesthetic engagement within, to an event outside of the artwork as a failure of Minimal art.

Ad Reinhardt, actually an artist of the Abstract Expressionist generation, but one whose reductive all-black paintings seemed to anticipate minimalism, had this to say about the value of a reductive approach to art: "The more stuff in it, the busier the work of art, the worse it is. More is less. Less is more. The eye is a menace to clear sight. The laying bare of oneself is obscene. Art begins with the getting rid of nature."

During the 1960s and 1970s artists as powerful and influential as Adolph Gottlieb, Phillip Guston, Lee Krasner, Richard Diebenkorn, Elmer Bischoff, Agnes Martin, Sam Francis, Gene Davis, Joan Mitchell, Friedel Dzubas, and younger artists like Sam Gilliam, Sean Scully, Pat Steir, Elizabeth Murray, Walter Darby Bannard, Dan Christensen, Joan Snyder, Richard Tuttle, Ross Bleckner, Archie Rand, Susan Crile, and dozens of others produced vital and influential paintings.

Still other important innovations in abstract painting took place during the 1960s and the 1970s characterized by Monochrome painting and Hard-edge painting inspired by Ad Reinhardt, Barnett Newman, Milton Resnick, and Ellsworth Kelly. Artists as diversified as Al Held, Larry Zox, Frank Stella, Larry Poons, Brice Marden and others explored the power of simplification. The convergence of Color Field painting, Minimal art, Hard-edge painting, Lyrical Abstraction, and Postminimalism blurred the distinction between movements that became more apparent in the 1980s and 1990s. The Neo-expressionism movement is related to earlier developments in Abstract expressionism, Neo-Dada, Lyrical Abstraction and Postminimal painting.

Neo-expressionism

In the late 1960s the abstract expressionist painter Philip Guston helped to lead a transition from abstract expressionism to Neo-expressionism in painting, abandoning the so-called "pure abstraction" of abstract expressionism in favor of more cartoonish renderings of various personal symbols and objects. These works were inspirational to a new generation of painters interested in a revival of expressive imagery. His painting Painting, Smoking, Eating is an example of Guston's return to representation.

In the late 1970s and early 1980s, there was also a return to painting that occurred almost simultaneously in Italy, Germany, France and Britain. These movements were called Transavantguardia, Neue Wilde, Figuration Libre, Neo-expressionism, the school of London, and in the late 80s the Stuckists respectively. These painting were characterized by large formats, free expressive mark making, figuration, myth and imagination.  All work in this genre came to be labeled neo-expressionism.

Neo-expressionism was a style of modern painting that became popular in the late 1970s and dominated the art market until the mid-1980s. It developed in Europe as a reaction against the conceptual and minimalistic art of the 1960s and 1970s. Neo-expressionists returned to portraying recognizable objects, such as the human body (although sometimes in a virtually abstract manner) in a rough and violently emotional way using vivid colors and banal color harmonies. The veteran painters Philip Guston, Frank Auerbach, Leon Kossoff, Gerhard Richter, A. R. Penck and Georg Baselitz, along with the slightly younger artists Damien Hirst, Anselm Kiefer, the Americans Eric Fischl, Susan Rothenberg, David Salle, Jean-Michel Basquiat, Julian Schnabel, and Keith Haring, the Italians Francesco Clemente, Mimmo Paladino, Sandro Chia, and Enzo Cucchi, and many others became known for working in this intense expressionist vein of painting. Critical reaction was divided. Some critics regarded it as driven by profit motivations by large commercial galleries.

Anselm Kiefer is a leading figure in European Neo-expressionism. By the 1980s, Kiefer's themes widened from a focus on Germany's role in civilization to the fate of art and culture in general. His work became more sculptural and involves not only national identity and collective memory, but also occult symbolism, theology and mysticism. The theme of all the work is the trauma experienced by entire societies, and the continual rebirth and renewal in life.

Painting still holds a respected position in contemporary art. Art is an open field no longer divided by the objective versus non-objective dichotomy. Artists can achieve critical success whether their images are representational or abstract. What has currency is content, exploring the boundaries of the medium, and a refusal to recapitulate the works of the past as an end goal.Timothy Hyman, The World New Made: Figurative Painting in the Twentieth Century, Thames & Hudson, 2016, 

Contemporary painting into the 21st century

Throughout the 20th century and into the 21st century, with the advent of Modern and Postmodern art forms, distinctions between what is generally regarded as the fine arts and the low arts have started to fade, as contemporary high art continues to challenge these concepts by mixing with popular culture.

Mainstream painting has been rejected by artists of the postmodern era in favor of artistic pluralism. According to art critic Arthur Danto there is an anything goes attitude that prevails; an "everything going on", and consequently "nothing going on" syndrome; this creates an aesthetic traffic jam with no firm and clear direction and with every lane on the artistic superhighway filled to capacity.

See also
 Art of Australia
 Art periods
 Early Renaissance painting
 Hierarchy of genres
 History of art
 History of Eastern art
 Indian painting
 History painting
 Japonism
 List of painters
 Lives of the Most Excellent Painters, Sculptors, and Architects Native American art
 Painting in the Americas before Colonization
 Self portrait
 Timeline of Italian artists to 1800
 Visual arts of Australia
 Visual arts of the United States
 Western European paintings in Ukrainian museums
 Mughal painting

References

Sources
 Clement Greenberg, Art and Culture, Beacon Press, 1961
 
 The Triumph of Modernism: The Art World, 1985–2005, Hilton Kramer, 2006, 
 Pictures of Nothing: Abstract Art since Pollock (A.W. Mellon Lectures in the Fine Arts), Kirk Varnedoe, 2003
 O'Connor, Francis V. Jackson Pollock Exhibition Catalogue, (New York, Museum of Modern Art, [1967]) OCLC 165852
 Lyrical Abstraction, Exhibition Catalogue, Whitney Museum of American Art, NYC, 1971.
 David Piper, The Illustrated Library of Art, Portland House, New York, 1986, 
 Agee, William C.; Rose, Barbara, 1979, Patrick Henry Bruce: American Modernist (exhibition catalogue), Houston: Museum of Fine Arts
On the effects of Gutenberg's printing
 Elizabeth L. Eisenstein, The Printing Press as an Agent of Change, Cambridge University Press, September 1980, Paperback, 832 pages, 
 More recent, abridged version: Elizabeth L. Eisenstein, The Printing Revolution in Early Modern Europe, Cambridge University Press, 2Rev ed, 12 September 2005, Paperback, 
 Marshall McLuhan, The Gutenberg Galaxy: The Making of Typographic Man (1962) University of Toronto Press (1st ed.); reissued by Routledge & Kegan Paul .
 Briggs & Burke, A Social History of the Media: The Print Revolution in Context'' (2002)

External links
 History of Painting
 History of Art: From Paleolithic Age to Contemporary Art
 Robert Hughes from Artchive
 MNstate.edu , Kandinsky Concerning the Spiritual in Art, accessed online 28 May 2007

Painting
Painting
Painting
Western culture

pt:Pintura ocidental